Serra de la Mussara is a mountain range of Catalonia, Spain. It is a subrange of the Prades Mountains.

There are very steep cliffs in this range, like the Cingle del Patxeco. The Serra de la Mussara mountain range is named after the abandoned village of La Mussara, located in the range.

See also
Prades Mountains
Mountains of Catalonia

References

Mussara